At the 1956 Winter Olympics six cross-country skiing events – four for men and two for women – were contested after men's 30 km and women's 3 × 5 km relay were added. The competitions were held from Friday, 27 January, to Sunday, 4 February 1956.

Medal summary

Medal table

Men's events

Women's events

Participating nations

References

External links
International Olympic Committee results database

 
1956 Winter Olympics
1956 Winter Olympics events
Olympics
Cross-country skiing competitions in Italy